Berrios or Berríos is a Spanish surname. Notable people with the surname include:

Celebrity
Gabriela Berrios (born 1990), Puerto Rican model and Miss Universe Puerto Rico 2014

Music
Danny Berrios (born 1961), American singer
Steve Berrios (1945–2013), American jazz drummer and percussionist

Politics
Ángel O. Berríos (1940–2006), Puerto Rican politician
Baudilio Vega Berríos (1902–1987), Puerto Rican politician
Carmen Berríos, Puerto Rican politician
Carmen Luz Berríos, Puerto Rican politician
Joseph Berrios (born 1952), American politician
Maria Antonia Berrios (born 1977), American politician
Rubén Berríos (born 1939), Puerto Rican lawyer and politician

Science
Eugenio Berríos (1947–1992), Chilean biochemist
Reyes Manuel Berríos, Puerto Rican chemist and musician
G. E. Berrios, Peruvian psychiatrist

Sports
Braxton Berrios (born 1995), American football player
Gregory Berrios (born 1979), Puerto Rican volleyball player
Harry Berrios (born 1971), American baseball player and coach
Héctor Berríos (born 1986), Chilean footballer
José Berríos (born 1994), Puerto Rican baseball player
Mario Esteban Berríos (born 1981), Chilean footballer
Mario René Berríos (born 1982), Honduran footballer

Spanish-language surnames